The 84th parallel north is a circle of latitude that is 84 degrees north of the Earth's equatorial plane, in the Arctic. No land lies on the 84th parallel north; it only lies on the Arctic Ocean; this is the first parallel by degree to do so. Regions north of this latitude are excluded from UTM Zones.

The northernmost land on earth, Kaffeklubben Island, Greenland is roughly 40 kilometres south of this parallel.  

At this latitude the sun is visible for 24 hours, 0 minutes during the summer solstice and during the winter solstice, the latitude is under astronomical twilight.

See also
 83rd parallel north
 85th parallel north
 Arctic Ocean

n84
Geography of the Arctic